Fältrittklubben (more specifically Stockholms fältrittklubb) or the Stockholm Cross Country Riding Club is an equestrian club located in Stockholm, Sweden, established in 1886 by Prince Carl, Duke of Västergötland. During the 1912 Summer Olympics, it hosted the endurance trials for the equestrian eventing competition.

References
1912 Summer Olympics official report. p. 221.

Venues of the 1912 Summer Olympics
Olympic equestrian venues
Sports venues in Stockholm
Equestrian sports in Sweden
Sports teams in Sweden
Sports clubs established in 1886